3rd Arkansas Infantry Regiment may refer to:

American Civil War

Confederate 
 3rd Arkansas Infantry
 3rd Consolidated Arkansas Infantry
 3rd Infantry, a unit of the Provisional Army of Arkansas

Union 
 3rd Arkansas Infantry
 56th United States Colored Infantry, formerly 3rd Arkansas Infantry (African Descent)